The following is a list of mobile games developed and published by Sega.

Games

References 

 
S
mobile
Sega